Al-Maghrabi, El Maghrabi, El-Maghrabi or Al-Maghrebi (: "the Moroccan"); is an Arabic language surname which is also common among the Arab diaspora. Notable people with the surname include:

Al-Maghrabi
 Khaled Al-Maghrabi (born 1992), Saudi Arabian football player
 Muhammad Al Maghrabi (born 1985), Libyan footballer

El Maghrabi
 Ahmed El Maghrabi (born 1945), Egyptian businessman and politician
 Mohamed El Maghrabi (born 2001), Egyptian footballer

El-Maghrabi
 Khalil Amira El-Maghrabi (1914–1976), Egyptian boxer

Al-Maghrebi
 Abu Usamah al-Maghrebi (1986–2014), senior military commander of the Islamic State of Iraq
 Ismael Al-Maghrebi (born 1991), Saudi Arabian football player

Arabic-language surnames
Surnames of Saudi Arabian origin
Surnames of Libyan origin
Surnames of Egyptian origin